Porno Graffitti (Stylized as PORNO GRAFFITTI) is the seventh studio album by the Japanese pop-rock band Porno Graffitti. It was released on August 29, 2007.

Track listing

References

2007 albums
Porno Graffitti albums
Japanese-language albums
Sony Music albums